Nuclear Guru is an EP by British stoner metal band Orange Goblin, released in 1997 on Man's Ruin Records. It was released on 10" vinyl and later released as a split CD with Electric Wizard entitled Chrono.Naut/Nuclear Guru. The tracks can also be found on the Japanese edition of Frequencies from Planet Ten and the 2CD of said album & Time Travelling Blues. "Hand of Doom" is a Black Sabbath cover. The cover art features a distorted image of Shoko Asahara, leader of the Japanese cult Aum Shinrikyo.

Track listing 
"Nuclear Guru" – 6:47
"Hand of Doom" (Black Sabbath) – 7:02

References 

Orange Goblin albums
1997 EPs
Man's Ruin Records EPs